The 2023 Asian Indoor Athletics Championships was the tenth edition of the international indoor athletics event among Asian nations. It took place at the Kazakhstan Sports Palace in Astana, the first ever edition in  Kazakhstan, from 10 to 12 February.

Results

Men

Women

Medal table

Participating nations

References

Results
Official results

External links
Official Asian Athletics Association website

2018
Asian Indoor Championships
Indoor Championships
Sport in Astana
International sports competitions hosted by Kazakhstan
Asian Indoor Athletics Championships
Asian Indoor Athletics Championships